The New Guangxi clique, led by Li Zongren, Huang Shaohong, and Bai Chongxi, was a warlord clique during the Republic of China. After the founding of the Republic, Guangxi served as the base for one of the Old Guangxi clique, one of the most powerful warlord cliques of China. In the early 1920s, the Guangdong–Guangxi War saw the pro-Kuomintang New Guangxi clique replace the Old clique.

Lu Rongting and the Yue-Gui Wars

In 1920, Chen Jiongming drove Lu Rongting and the Old Guangxi clique out of Guangdong in the First Yue-Gui War. In 1921 Chen pushed into Guangxi, starting the Second Yue-Gui war, forcing Lu Rongting to step down in July 1921. By August, Chen had occupied Nanning and the rest of Guangxi. Chen Jiongming and the Cantonese forces occupied Guangxi until April 1922. Their occupation was largely nominal because armed bands of Guangxi loyalists began to gather under local commanders, calling themselves the Self-government Army. Sun Yat-sen and Chen Jiongming soon split over the continuation of the Northern Expedition. Chen, however, aspired merely to be the warlord of Guangdong and after the Zhili clique in Beijing recognized his power in the south, he abandoned Sun Yat-sen. By May 1922 the Cantonese forces had evacuated Guangxi leaving a power vacuum.

Aftermath of the Yue-Gui Wars

Lu Rongting could construct a political and military machine from the forces that composed the Self-government Armies, by calling on friendship, family, and Zhuang ethnicity, but the lack of such a leader led to a rapid collapse into localism, which occurred as the Guangdong forces withdrew. There was intense fighting to re-occupy territory or to attempt to strip the retreating forces of their supplies and munitions.

With the support of Wu Peifu and the Zhili clique Lu Rongting slipped back into Guangxi in 1923 and began to try to rebuild his coalition. He soon had control over the south with its important pool of Zhuang manpower, but the situation had changed and his political organization could not be rebuilt. Among the younger men who had been trained in military schools after the 1911 revolution there was a new appreciation for modern tactics, weapons, and political means. In the confused power struggles following the Yue-Gui Wars, these local military men began to carve out territory in Guangxi and dominate it.

In the southwest there were opium trails from Yunnan and Guizhou that ran through Baise and then down the river to Nanning. From these opium usually went out through Wuzhou, where the trade was financed. During the Yue-Gui wars, Huang Shaohong, then the commander of the Model Battalion of the 1st Guangxi Division, and Bai Chongxi his former deputy, attempted to stay neutral and relocated to Baise. Huang eventually got control of Baise, and the opium trade. Later he expanded his control to Wuzhou, thus controlling the routes through which opium both entered and left Guangxi. With his opium revenue Bai was able to build a well-equipped and trained force.

During the Yue-Gui Wars, Li Zongren had accompanied Lin Hu and Lu Rongting into Guangdong and led the rear guard when the Old Guangxi Clique forces retreated before Chen Jiongming's attack. During the campaign Li Zongren's battalion, was reduced to about one thousand men and "sank into the grasses."  But Li, intending to become more than a bandit, began building a personal military machine of professional units of soldiers. These were to be the equal of any force in China and more than a match for any number of bandits or Zhuang irregulars that Lu Rongting drew on in his war to re-establish his power in Guangxi. Li joined the Kuomintang in 1923, when he already controlled a considerable numbers of troops in northern Guangxi and wiped out the local bandits, warlords, and remnant forces of the Old Guangxi clique in the north.

New Guangxi clique takes power

By the spring of 1924, Huang Shaohong, Bai Chongxi, and Li Zongren, formed the New Guangxi clique and had created the well equipped Guangxi Pacification Army. Li Zongren was the Commander in Chief, Huang Shaohong the deputy Commander, and Bai Chongxi the Chief-of-Staff. By August they had defeated and driven the former ruler Lu Rongting and other contenders out of the province. Li Zongren was military governor of Guangxi from 1924–25, and from 1925 to 1949.

The coalition's efforts brought Guangxi Province under the jurisdiction of the Republic of China. Li Zongren was military governor of Guangxi from 1924–25, Huang became the civil governor of Guangxi from 1924 to 1929, and Guangxi remained under Li Zongren's influence until 1949. The New Guangxi clique made attempts at modernising between 1926 and 1927, when the Guangxi clique controlled Guangxi and much of Guangdong, Hunan, and Hubei. The New Guangxi clique was much more active in modernizing than Lu Rongting had been. They founded the University of Guangxi in Nanning, built over five thousand kilometers of roads and  extended electrification of the area.

However, because the clique had to constantly be mobilized for war, first against the Guangdong warlords, then later against the Japanese, the tax burden which they levied was far heavier than that of Lu Rongting. The New Guangxi Clique also taxed the opium trade. As was later true for Chiang Kai-shek's government, the taxes were collected via opium suppression offices, ostensibly created to destroy the trade. In 1932 opium income amounted to fifty million dollars, the largest source of income in the provincial budget.

New Guangxi Clique and the Northern Expedition

During the Northern Expedition, Bai Chongxi was the Chief of Staff of the National Revolutionary Army and led the Eastern Route Army which conquered Hangzhou and Shanghai in 1927. As garrison commander of Shanghai, Bai also took part in the purge of Communists in the National Revolutionary Army on April 12, 1927 and of the labour unions in Shanghai. 
Li Zongren  was the general of the Seventh Army in the Northern Expedition. Li went on to be the commanding general of the Seventh Army in the Northern Expedition and captured Wuhan in 1927. Li was then appointed commander of the Fourth Army Group, composed of the Guangxi Army and other provincial forces amounting to 16 corps and six independent divisions. In April 1928, Li Zongren, with Bai Chongxi, who was credited with many victories over the northern warlords, led the Fourth Army group to advance on Beijing, capturing Handan, Baoding, and Shijiazhuang, by June 1. Zhang Zuolin withdrew from Beijing on June 3, and Li's army seized Beijing   Bai commanded the forward units which first entered Beijing and Tianjin.

New Guangxi clique and Chiang Kai-shek
At the end of the Northern Expedition, Chiang Kai-shek began to agitate to reorganize the army, the fact that it would alter the existing territorial influences among the Cliques in the party quickly aggravated the relationships between the central government and the regional powers. Li Zongren, Bai Chongxi and Huang Shaohong of the Guangxi Clique were the first to break off relations with Chiang in March 1929, which started the confrontation that lead to the Central Plains War. Chiang Kai-shek defeated the Clique in 1929. Following defeat in that civil war, Guangxi allied with Chen Jitang after he became chairman of the government of Guangdong in 1931, and turned against Chiang Kai-shek. Another civil war would have broken out if there had been no September 18 Incident, which prompted all sides to unite against the Empire of Japan. As a result, from 1930 to 1936, the Clique organized the reconstruction of Guangxi, which became a "model" province with a progressive administration. As a result, Guangxi was able to supply large numbers of troops in the war effort against Japan in the Second Sino-Japanese War.

See also
Warlord Era
List of Warlords

Sources
 Lary, Diana. (1974). Region and nation: the Kwangsi clique in Chinese politics, 1925-1937. London, Cambridge University Press .
 The Kwangsi Way in Kuomintang China, 1931-1939
 Mobilization and Reconstruction in Kwangsi Province, 1931-1939
 陈贤庆(Chen Xianqing),  民国军阀派系谈 (The Republic of China warlord cliques discussed), 2007 revised edition

1924 establishments in China
1949 disestablishments in China
Warlord cliques in Republican China
Guangxi